Lisman is a town in Choctaw County, Alabama, United States. At the 2020 census, the population was 427. Lisman was named after a 19th-century railroad investor at the time of construction of the nearby rail line.

Geography
Lisman is located in northern Choctaw County at 32°10'19.978" North, 88°17'21.667" West (32.172216, -88.289352).

History 
In 1962, local residents participated in "a federal lawsuit challenging the white Choctaw County registrars who were rejecting 95 percent of black voters’ applications." Martin Luther King visited the town to lead a rally for voting rights on April 30, 1966.

The town incorporated in 1979, which enabled it to pave its dirt roads, and build sewers.

A 2019 article described Mayor Jason Ward's plans to hire a police officer and rebuild the abandoned school library.

Lisman was not included in Choctaw County's new “Opportunity Zones” in 2019.

Demographics

As of the census of 2000, there were 653 people, 245 households, and 171 families residing in the town. The racial makeup of the town was 91.42% Black or African American, 7.20% White and 1.38% from two or more races. 0.15% of the population were Hispanic or Latino of any race.

There were 245 households, out of which 33.1% had children under the age of 18 living with them, 42.4% were married couples living together, 24.5% had a female householder with no husband present, and 29.8% were non-families. 28.2% of all households were made up of individuals, and 10.6% had someone living alone who was 65 years of age or older. The average household size was 2.67 and the average family size was 3.28.

In the town, the population was spread out, with 31.1% under the age of 18, 6.9% from 18 to 24, 25.4% from 25 to 44, 23.3% from 45 to 64, and 13.3% who were 65 years of age or older. The median age was 36 years. For every 100 females, there were 82.9 males. For every 100 females age 18 and over, there were 83.7 males.

The median income for a household in the town was $20,333, and the median income for a family was $22,750. Males had a median income of $31,719 versus $14,375 for females. The per capita income for the town was $11,295. About 36.4% of families and 36.7% of the population were below the poverty line, including 40.7% of those under age 18 and 37.9% of those age 65 or over.

References

External links
Coastal Gateway Regional Economic Development Alliance

Towns in Alabama
Towns in Choctaw County, Alabama